Zude is a name. It may refer to:

 Arno Zude (born 1964), German chess player and problemist
 Chen Zude (1944–2012), Chinese professional Go player
 Song Zude (born 1968), Chinese businessman and entertainer

Other
 Zude (portmanteau), a portmanteau for the characters Jude Kinkade and Zero on the VH1 series Hit the Floor

German-language surnames